The 2004 All-Ireland Senior Football Championship, known for sponsorship reasons as the 2004 Bank of Ireland All-Ireland Senior Football Championship was the premier Gaelic football competition in 2005. It consisted of 33 teams and began on Sunday 2 May 2004. The championship concluded on Sunday 26 September 2004, when Mayo were defeated by Kerry by 1–20 to 2–9.

Format
Since the introduction of the so-called "back-door" system, a number of changes have taken place in the championship format. In 2004 the following system was used:

The provincial championships in Munster, Leinster, Ulster and Connacht ran as usual on a "knock-out" basis.  These provincial games were then followed by the "Qualifier" system:
Round 1 of the qualifiers included all the counties (except New York) that do not qualify for the Provincial Semifinals. An open draw was made to give eight pairings.
Round 2 consisted of the eight defeated teams in the Provincial Semifinals playing against the eight winners from Round 1. A draw was made to determine the eight pairings.
Round 3 consisted of the eight winners from Round 2. Another open draw was made to determine the four pairings.
Round 4 consisted of each of the four teams defeated in the Provincial Finals playing against the four winners from Round 3. A draw was made to determine the four pairings.

The All-Ireland Quarterfinals: Each of the four Provincial Champions played one of the four winners from Round 4. The All-Ireland Semifinals were on a Provincial rota basis, initially determined by the Central Council. If a Provincial Championship winning was defeated in its Quarterfinal, the team that defeated it would take its place in the Semifinal.

Provincial championships

Munster Senior Football Championship

Quarter-finals

Semi-finals

Final

Leinster Senior Football Championship

First round

Quarter-finals

Semi-finals

Final

Ulster Senior Football Championship

Preliminary round

Quarter-finals

Semi-finals

Final

Connacht Senior Football Championship

Quarter-finals

Semi-finals

Final

Qualifiers

Round 1 
The losers of the Preliminary round matches and quarter final matches of each provincial championship started the qualifier.

Tipperary withdrew from the competition following the resignation of their manager, Andy Shorthall, giving Fermanagh a walkover into Round 2.

Round 2 
The winners of round 1 were joined by the semi final losers of each provincial championship. The matches would be between a round 2 winner and a provincial championship semi final loser.

Round 3 
The winners of round 2 contest as the matches from here were lowered to four. Matches were open.

Round 4 
The winners of round 3 were joined by the losers of each provincial championship final. The matches would be between a round 3 winner and the loser of a provincial championship final.

All-Ireland Senior Football Championship 
The provincial champions and the winners of round 4 contested the quarter finals. The quarter final matches would be between a provincial champion and a round 4 winner.

Quarter-finals

Semi-finals

Final

Championship statistics

Miscellaneous

 Carlow defeat Longford in the Leinster Championship for the first time since 1977.
 Limerick and Waterford meet in the Munster Championship for the first time since 1991.
 The Ulster final was moved from St Tiernach's Park, Clones to Croke Park, Dublin.
 Westmeath win the Leinster Championship for the very first time in their history.

Top scorers

References

All-Ireland Senior Football Championship